Edward Gordon "Ned" Randolph, Jr. (February 1, 1942 – October 4, 2016), was an American politician who served in the Louisiana House of Representatives from 1972 to 1976, in the Louisiana State Senate from 1976 to 1984, and as mayor of Alexandria, Louisiana from 1986 to 2006. Randolph ran for a seat in the United States House of Representatives in 1982 and 1992, losing both campaigns. In 1997, Randolph lost a bid for a seat on the Louisiana Circuit Courts of Appeal. Randolph was inducted into the Louisiana Political Museum and Hall of Fame in 2008.

Death and legacy
Randolph died on October 4, 2016, from complications of Alzheimer's disease. An outpouring of remembrances by members of the Louisiana House of Representatives, Louisiana State Senate, former governors, Governor John Bel Edwards, and numerous other former and current local, state, and national public servants followed.

On November 27, 2018, the Alexandria City Council voted to name the downtown convention in Randolph's honor to focus upon the late mayor's emphasis on economic development. The official name is the Alexandria Edward G. "Ned" Randolph Riverfront Center; in short form, the Randolph Riverfront Center. First opened in 1996 with a price tag of $17.2 million, of which $13 million was state funded, the center has more than 67,000 square feet of events space and is connected to the Hotel Bentley and the Holiday Inn Downtown.

References

1942 births
2016 deaths
Democratic Party Louisiana state senators
Democratic Party members of the Louisiana House of Representatives
Tulane University alumni
Princeton University alumni
Mayors of Alexandria, Louisiana
Bolton High School (Louisiana) alumni
People from Colfax, Louisiana
Neurological disease deaths in Louisiana
Deaths from Alzheimer's disease